The Tower of David, also known as the Citadel, is an ancient citadel located near the Jaffa Gate entrance to the Old City of Jerusalem.

The citadel that stands today dates to the Mamluk and Ottoman periods. It was built on the site of a series of earlier ancient fortifications of the Hasmonean, Herodian, Byzantine and Early Muslim periods, after being destroyed repeatedly during the last decades of Crusader presence in the Holy Land by their Muslim enemies. It contains important archaeological finds dating back over 2,500 years including a quarry dated to the First Temple period, and is a popular venue for benefit events, craft shows, concerts, and sound-and-light performances.

Dan Bahat, the Israeli archeologist, writes that the original three Hasmonean towers standing in this area of the city were altered by Herod, and that "The northeastern tower was replaced by a much larger, more massive tower, dubbed the "Tower of David" beginning in the 5th century C.E." The name "Tower of David" migrated in the 19th century from the Herodian tower in the northeast of the citadel, to the 17th-century minaret at the opposite side of the citadel, and after 1967 has been officially adopted for the entire citadel.

Names

"Tower of David": Herodian tower
The name "Tower of David" was first used for the Herodian tower in the 5th century CE by the Byzantine Christians, who believed the site to be the palace of King David. They borrowed the name "Tower of David" from the Song of Songs, attributed to Solomon, King David's son, who wrote: "Thy neck is like the Tower of David built with turrets, whereon there hang a thousand shields, all the armor of the mighty men".

Arabic names

Please note that there is also another mihrab (prayer niche) called , built into the inner side of the Southern Wall of the Haram esh-Sharif/Temple Mount.

History

Hasmonean period
During the 2nd century BCE, the Old City of Jerusalem expanded further onto the so-called Western Hill. This 773-meter-high prominence, which comprises the modern Armenian and Jewish Quarters as well as Mount Zion, was bounded by steep valleys on all sides except for the north. The first settlement in this area was about 150 BCE, around the time of the Hasmonean kings, when what Josephus Flavius called "the First Wall" was constructed.

Herod's towers

Herod, who wrestled the power away from the Hasmonean dynasty, added three massive towers to the fortifications in 37–34 BCE. He built these at the vulnerable northwest corner of the Western Hill, where the Citadel is now located. His purpose was not only to defend the city, but to safeguard his own royal palace located nearby on Mount Zion. Herod named the tallest of the towers,  in height, Phasael, in memory of his brother who had committed suicide while in captivity. Another tower was called Mariamne, named for his second wife whom he had executed and buried in a cave to the west of the tower. He named the third tower Hippicus after one of his friends. Of the three towers, only the base of one of them survives until today—either the Phasael or, as argued by archaeologist Hillel Geva who excavated the Citadel, the Hippicus Tower. Of the original tower itself (now called the Tower of David), some sixteen courses of the Herodian stone ashlars are still rising from ground level (partially hidden by a much later built glacis), upon which were added smaller stones in a later period, which added back significantly to the height of the remaining stump of the Herodian tower.

During the Jewish war with Rome, Simon bar Giora made the tower his place of residence. Following the destruction of Jerusalem by the Romans in 70 CE, the three towers were preserved as a testimony of the might of the fortifications overcome by the Roman legions, and the site served as barracks for the Roman troops.

When the empire adopted Christianity as its favoured religion in the 4th century, a community of monks established itself in the citadel.

Early Muslims, Crusaders, Ayyubids
After the Arab conquest of Jerusalem in 638, the new Muslim rulers refurbished the citadel. This powerful structure withstood the assault of the Crusaders in 1099, and surrendered only when its defenders were guaranteed safe passage out of the city.

During the Crusader period, thousands of pilgrims undertook the pilgrimage to Jerusalem by way of the port at Jaffa. To protect pilgrims from the menace of highway robbers, the Crusaders built a tower surrounded by a moat atop the citadel, and posted lookouts to guard the road to Jaffa. The citadel also protected the newly erected palace of the Crusader kings of Jerusalem, located immediately south of the citadel.

In 1187, Sultan Saladin captured the city including the citadel. In 1239 the Ayyubid emir of Karak, An-Nasir Dawud, attacked the Crusader garrison and destroyed the citadel. In their 1244 siege of the city, the Khwarazmians defeated and banished the Crusaders from Jerusalem for a last time, destroying the entire city in the process. The Mamluks destroyed the citadel in 1260.

Mamluk and Ottoman citadel
In 1310 the citadel was rebuilt by Mamluk sultan Al-Nasir Muhammad ibn Qalawun, who gave it much of its present shape.

The citadel was expanded between 1537 and 1541 by the Ottoman sultan Suleiman the Magnificent, whose architects designed a large entrance, behind which stood a cannon emplacement. For 400 years, the citadel served as a garrison for Turkish troops. The Ottomans also installed a mosque near the southwest corner of the citadel commonly known as the Mihrab el-Qal'a ed-Dawood ("Prayer niche of David's fortress"), erecting a minaret during the years 1635-1655. In the 19th century the conspicuous minaret, which still stands today, became commonly referred to as the "Tower of David". At least two mosques are known to exist within the Jerusalem Citadel.

During World War I, British forces under General Edmund Allenby captured Jerusalem. General Allenby formally proclaimed the event standing on a platform at the outer eastern gate of the citadel.

British and Jordanian periods

During the period of British rule (1917–1948), the High Commissioner established the Pro-Jerusalem Society to protect the city's cultural heritage. This organisation cleaned and renovated the citadel and reopened it to the public as a venue for concerts, benefit events and exhibitions by local artists. In the 1930s, a museum of Palestinian folklore was opened in the citadel, displaying traditional crafts and clothing.

Following the 1948 Arab–Israeli War, the Arab Legion captured Jerusalem and converted the citadel back to its historical role as a military position, as it commanded a dominant view across the armistice line into Jewish Jerusalem. It would keep this role until 1967.

Tower of David Museum

Since the Six-Day War in  1967, the citadel's cultural role was revived.

The Tower of David Museum of the History of Jerusalem was opened in 1989 by the Jerusalem Foundation. Located in a series of chambers in the original citadel, the museum includes a courtyard which contains archeological remains dating back 2,700 years.

The exhibits depict 4,000 years of Jerusalem's history, from its beginnings as a Canaanite city to modern times. Using maps, videotapes, holograms, drawings and models, the exhibit rooms each depict Jerusalem under its various rulers. Visitors may also ascend to the ramparts, which command a 360-degree view of the Old City and New City of Jerusalem.

As of 2002, the Jerusalem Foundation reported that over 3.5 million visitors had toured the museum.

Archaeology

In 2010, a survey of the site was conducted by Yehudah Rapuano on behalf of the Israel Antiquities Authority (IAA).

See also
 Jaffa Gate, the Jerusalem city gate protected by the citadel
 Illés Relief, model of Jerusalem built in 1867-73
 Tower of David Period, nickname for Jewish art in Palestine during the 1920s

References

External links

 360 degrees HD virtual tour of the Tower of David Museum 
 Tower of David Museum
 A tourist's guide to the Tower of David Museum

Further reading
For Mihrab Da'ud and Early Muslim traditions regarding David see: 

Museums in Jerusalem
Crusader castles
Castles and fortifications of the Kingdom of Jerusalem
Classical sites in Jerusalem
Medieval sites in Jerusalem
Buildings and structures in Jerusalem
Historic sites in Jerusalem
Archaeological sites in Jerusalem